The 2008 FINA Men's Water Polo World League was the seventh edition of the annual event, organised by the world's governing body in aquatics, the FINA. After five preliminary rounds the Super Final was held in Genoa, Italy from June 16 to June 22, 2008.

Preliminary round

Africa 
Held in Casablanca, Morocco 

June 6

June 7

June 8

Americas 
 and  qualified without qualification tournament.

Asia/Oceania 
Held in Tokyo, Japan 

May 26

May 27

May 28

May 29

May 30

Europe I 
Held in Budva, Montenegro and Athens, Greece.

Italy qualified as the hosting nation of the Super Final

May 23

May 24

May 25

May 30

May 31

June 1

Europe II 
Held in Novi Sad, Serbia and Portugalete, Spain.

May 23

May 24

May 25

May 30

May 31

June 1

Super Final
Held in Genova, Italy

Group A 

June 16

June 17

June 18

June 19

June 20

Group B 

June 16

June 17

June 18

June 19

June 20

9th place match
June 21

5th-8th places

Medal round

Final ranking

Awards

References

 FINA

2008
W
W
International water polo competitions hosted by Italy